Christian Beeck (born 18 December 1971) is a German former professional footballer who played as a defender. He was the team captain of FC Energie Cottbus in the 2. Bundesliga.

Beeck's career ended after he suffered a knee injury when playing for Cottbus. On 27 September 2005, he took a coaching role with Union Berlin.

After retiring
After retiring in 2005, Beeck was hired as athletic supervisor for Union Berlin. He left the job in 2011, and was hired at Energie Cottbus also as athletic supervisor. In June 2013 he left the job.

References

1971 births
Living people
People from Rathenow
People from Bezirk Potsdam
German footballers
Association football defenders
Footballers from Brandenburg
SG Bergmann-Borsig players
1. FC Union Berlin players
FC Hansa Rostock players
Fortuna Düsseldorf players
FC Energie Cottbus players
Bundesliga players
2. Bundesliga players